Östra kyrkogården (English: Eastern cemetery) is a cemetery in Gothenburg, Sweden. It is located in the parish of Örgryte, in the Diocese of Gothenburg. Including the urns, it is estimated to be the resting place of 150,000 people. The cemetery houses the graves of many notable citizens of Gothenburg, whose work and donations helped shape the city. Many of their tombstones and monuments are stately works of art.

A Jewish burial site is located at the southern end of the cemetery.

History
The land for the cemetery was bought for 60,000 riksdaler from the owner of the Bagaregården estate. The cemetery was designed by architect J. H. Strömberg and inaugurated on 16 November 1860 by dean Peter Wieselgren under the name Begravningsplatsen ("The Burial Place"). The first burial took place on 27 February 1861. During the first year of operation, 348 adults and 648 children were buried there, as measles and diphtheria were raging in the city.

In 1890, the first crematory in Gothenburg was opened, designed by Swedish architect Hans Hedlund. It burned down on 23 December 1920, but was rebuilt. However, it was closed in 1951, and its functions were taken over by the crematory in the nearby district of Kviberg.

Notable interments

 Ivar Arosenius (1878–1909), painter
 Albert Ulrik Bååth (1853–1912), poet
 Karin Boye (1900–1941), poet
 Dan Broström (1870–1925), Swedish Naval Minister from 1914 to 1917
 Beatrice Dickson (1852–1941), temperance activist
 Bengt Erland Fogelberg (1786–1854), sculptor
 Pehr Gyllenhammar (1901–1988), Swedish insurance company executive
 Sven Adolf Hedlund (1821–1900), politician, founder of the Gothenburg Museum
 Oscar Kjellberg (1870–1931), engineer, inventor, and founder of ESAB
 Eric Lemming (1880–1930), athlete
 Erik Lönnroth (1910–2002), historian
 Otto Nordenskiöld (1869–1928), Finnish and Swedish geologist, geographer, and polar explorer
 Sven Renström (1793–1869), politician
 Viktor Rydberg (1928–1895), writer
 Sven Rydell (1905–1975), footballer
 Carl Skottsberg (1880–1963), botanist

References

Cemeteries in Sweden
Lutheran cemeteries
Buildings and structures in Gothenburg
Tourist attractions in Gothenburg
1860 establishments in Sweden